The women's 1500 metres race of the 2013–14 ISU Speed Skating World Cup 3, arranged in the Alau Ice Palace, in Astana, Kazakhstan, was held on 30 November 2013.

Brittany Bowe of the United States won the race, while Yuliya Skokova of Russia came second, and Brittany Schussler of Canada came third. Kim Bo-reum of South Korea won the Division B race.

Results
The race took place on Saturday, 30 November, with Division B scheduled in the afternoon session, at 15:48, and Division A scheduled in the evening session, at 19:46.

Division A

Division B

References

Women 1500
3